Umut Gündoğan (born 12 June 1990) is a Turkish professional footballer who plays as a midfielder for Olympic Charleroi.

Club career
In August 2021, Gündoğan signed with Olympic Charleroi after having been a free agent for more than a year.

International career
Gündoğan made his debut for the Turkish A2 national team on 5 March 2014.

Honours
Galatasaray
Türkiye Kupası: 2013–14

Club

References

External links
 Umut Gündoğan at TFF.org
 
 

1990 births
Living people
Footballers from Brussels
Turkish footballers
Turkey B international footballers
Turkish expatriate footballers
Belgian footballers
Belgian people of Turkish descent
Bucaspor footballers
Fethiyespor footballers
Galatasaray S.K. footballers
Şanlıurfaspor footballers
Adana Demirspor footballers
Manisaspor footballers
Boluspor footballers
R.W.D.M. Brussels F.C. players
RBC Roosendaal players
Eerste Divisie players
Challenger Pro League players
Süper Lig players
TFF First League players
Expatriate footballers in Belgium
Expatriate footballers in the Netherlands
Association football midfielders
R. Olympic Charleroi Châtelet Farciennes players
Belgian Third Division players